Muhammad Rafiq Azam (born 29 December 1963) is a Bangladeshi architect who is principal architect at Shatotto Architecture.

Career 
Azam graduated from Bangladesh University of Engineering and Technology in 1989.

In 2016, Dhaka South City Corporation launched the "Jol Sobujer Dhaka Project" with a 2 billion Bangladeshi Taka ($24M as of 2016) budget to revitalize 19 parks and 12 playgrounds. As part of the project, Azam and his team at Shatotto Architecture redesigned the  Shahid Abdul Alim Playground in Old Dhaka. The boundary wall was removed to make it more welcoming, improve visibility, and to discourage squatters, dumping, and other illegal activities. Trees were planted, and a  underground rainwater reservoir was added to alleviate flooding and help keep the grass green during the dry season. In January 2017, Azam and his team began work on the renovation of  Osmani Udyan park in Dhaka. The work was scheduled to be completed by June 2018, but after multiple design changes is still ongoing as of February 2021.

Projects

Awards 

 1991: Winner, Mimar International Design Competition- VII, London
 1996: IAB Design Award, awarded by the Institute of Architects Bangladesh
 2007: AR Awards for Emerging Architecture awards 2007
 2007: Berger Award for Excellence in Architecture for the project 'Meghna Residence'
 2007: The 2007 Kenneth F. Brown, Asia Pacific Culture & Architecture Design Award. US
 2008: Winner, 2nd cycle (Most Thought Provoking Project), World Architecture Community Award
 2008: Winner, 1st cycle, World Architecture Community Award
 2009: Leading European Architecture Award (LEAF)
 2009: Winner, Cityscape Architecture Award 2009
 2009: Winner, 5th cycle, World Architecture Community Award
 2012: Winner of Emirates Glass Leading European Architects' Forum (LEAF) Awards Residential Building of the year award (multiple occupancy)
 2012: Winner of World Architectural Community Award, 11th Cycle (5 times)
 2012: The South Asian “Architect of the Year” Award, 2011 (6 times)
 2015: The Edge PAM Green Excellence Award
 2016: Rise High Bangladesh : “Amazing Bangladeshi 2016”
 2017: Berger Award for Excellence in Architecture, Winner
 2017: World Architecture Festival Award (WAF), Winner for "Aga Khan Academy Bangladesh"
 2017: Cityscape Award for Emerging Markets, Winner for "South Huda's Skyline" in the category, "Residential-Medium to High Rise (Built)"
 2017: ARCASIA Gold Medal Award for "SA Family Graveyard" in the category "Public Amenity Buildings – Specialized"
 2018: AD100 Most Influential Names in Architecture
 Eurasian Prize Gold Diploma in Architecture 2020
 Eurasian Prize Silver Diploma in Urban Planning
 DNA Paris Design Awards 2021- Honorable Mention
 Outstanding Property Award London- Platinum Category
 AR Public Award 2022- High Commendations
 UIA 2030 Award 20220- High Commendations
 Commonwealth Associations of Architects Robert Matthew Lifetime Achievement Award 2022
 12th Idea-Tops Award China-2022 Winner for "Rasulbagh Children's Park"  
 2022: World Architecture Festival Award (WAF), Winner for "Rasulbagh Children's Park"

Exhibitions

 1985: 7th National Exhibition Bangladesh
 1986: 3rd Asian Art Biennial, Bangladesh
 1993: 6th Asian Art Biennial, Bangladesh
 1994: Tenth National Young Artists Exhibition, Dhaka
 1995: Solo Painting Exhibition, Nepal
 1995: 8th ARCASIA Forum Architectural Exhibition, Singapore
 1998: Solo Exhibition “ArTchitecture” in New York, U.S.
 1999: Solo Exhibition “ArTchitecture” in Drik Gallery, Dhaka
 2005: UIA2005, Architectural exhibition in Istanbul
 2005: Kenneth Brown Worldwide Travel Exhibition
 2007: AR Emerging Architecture Exhibition at the RIBA, London, Korea and Germany
 2008: “Nature is” a solo exhibition at Bengal Gallery, Dhaka
 2008: Architectural Excellence in Bangladesh, RAIA exhibition in Sydney, Australia
 2009: "Two Men Show" at Gallery Hittite, Yorkville art district Toronto, Canada
 2014: "Water in Light" at Bengal Art Lounge, Gulshan, Bangladesh
 2014: Venice Architectural Biennale 2014 (Time Space Existence)
 2016: Venice Architectural Biennale 2016 (Time Space Existence)
 2016: Dhaka Art Summit
 2019: Bengal Stream, Over the World

References

External links 
 
 
 
 
 
 
 
 
 
 
 
 
 
 
 
 

Living people
Bangladeshi architects
Bangladesh University of Engineering and Technology alumni
1963 births